Tri-Cities Prep, a Catholic High School is a private, Roman Catholic high school in Pasco, Washington. It is located in the Roman Catholic Diocese of Spokane.

Background 
Tri-Cities Prep was established in 1998 and is located in the Tri Cities area of Washington. Pasco is located in the Roman Catholic Diocese of Spokane, while Kennewick and Richland are in the Roman Catholic Diocese of Yakima.

Athletics 
Tri-Cities Prep is a member of the Eastern Washington Athletic Conference (EWAC). It competes at the 2B level in the WIAA. The school offers 11 sports: volleyball, football, and men's and women's cross-country in the fall; men's and women's basketball in the winter; and baseball, softball, and men's and women's golf in the spring.

State Appearances

External links 
 School Website

Notes and references 

Roman Catholic Diocese of Spokane
High schools in Franklin County, Washington
Catholic secondary schools in Washington (state)
Pasco, Washington
Educational institutions established in 1998
1998 establishments in Washington (state)